Executive National Bank is a Florida intrastate financial institution headquartered in the Miami area. The bank currently has five branches throughout Miami-Dade County.

Executive National Bank has been a member of the CDARS network since 2008.

Corporate history
The bank was founded as Jefferson National Bank, charter number 15974, in 1972. In 1981, it was acquired by the Safie family and renamed Executive National Bank. It is wholly owned by the Executive Banking Corporation, a one bank holding company, which has maintained continuous control of the bank with Carlos Safie as President and CEO.

Board Members
Roberto Arguello; President & CEO, Advisors Inc.
George Befeler, Esq.; Chairman & CEO, The Citadel Group
Maria Melendez Enriquez; Executive Vice President, American Government Certificates and Funds Corp.
Guillermo Fernandez-Quincoces; Buchanan Ingersoll PC
Elias N. Ede; Chairman and President, Ede Medical Corp.
Carlos Safie; Chairman and CEO, Executive National Bank

Notes

External links 
 Executive National Bank Website
 Company Profile at Manta
 Bauer Financial Bank Ratings 

Banks based in Florida
Companies based in Miami
Banks established in 1972
American companies established in 1972
1972 establishments in Florida